A sleeping bag is a padded or insulated bag for a person to sleep in.

Sleeping bag may also refer to:

Sleeping bag (infant), a bag-like garment for infants
"Sleeping Bag" (song), a 1985 song by ZZ Top
Sleeping Bag Records, an American record label
 Sleeping Bag (band), an alternative/indie rock band based out of Bloomington, Indiana